Daniel Marchildon is a Franco-Ontarian novelist, short story writer, children's author, journalist and screenwriter born in Penetanguishene, Ontario.  He won the 2011 French-language Trillium Book Award for children's literature for his novel La première guerre de Toronto.

References

External links

 
  Interview by Open Book Ontario
  Entry in L’ÎLE, l'Infocentre littéraire des écrivains québécois

Living people
Franco-Ontarian people
People from Penetanguishene
21st-century Canadian novelists
21st-century Canadian short story writers
Canadian male novelists
Canadian male short story writers
Canadian novelists in French
Canadian short story writers in French
Canadian children's writers in French
Canadian journalists
Canadian screenwriters in French
Writers from Ontario
21st-century Canadian male writers
Canadian male non-fiction writers
Year of birth missing (living people)
21st-century Canadian screenwriters